The NASA Group Achievement Award (GAA) is an award given by NASA to groups of government or non-government personnel in recognition of group accomplishments contributing to NASA's mission. The criteria for earning the Group Achievement Award are:
 The quality of results and the Agency or multi-Center level of impact on programs or operations;
 Effective management of cost and schedule;
 Customer satisfaction;
 Team growth and capacity for future contribution (Government personnel only); and
 Additional credit for development of innovative approaches, use of and contributions to lessons-learned data banks, and/or
 Success in responding to unforeseen crises.

See also
List of NASA awards

References

Awards and decorations of NASA
Year of establishment missing